Jindalee is a locality in the Riverina district of New South Wales, Australia. The Main South railway line passes through the area, and a passenger station was located there between 1896 and 1970. The town's name is derived from an aboriginal word meaning 'bare hill'.

References

Towns in the Riverina
Towns in New South Wales
Main Southern railway line, New South Wales